Valerie "Val" Ann Arioto (born April 10, 1989) is an American, former collegiate All-American, medal-winning Olympian, softball pitcher and first baseman. She was a pitcher and infielder for the California Golden Bears in the Pac-12 Conference. She has also served as a member of the United States women's national softball team since 2012, and at the 2020 Summer Olympics helped the team win a silver medal.

Career
Arioto attended Foothill High School and the University of California, Berkeley from 2008-10, 12, where she earned a Second Team and two First-Team All-Pac-12 honors, including being named 2012 Pac-12 Player of The Year. She was also recognized by the National Fastpitch Coaches Association as a Third Team and two-time First Team All-American. With United States women's national softball team she won 2011 World Cup of Softball and has since been a member for 8 years.

International career
Arioto represented Team USA at the 2020 Summer Olympics and won a silver medal. Arioto recorded three hits and two walks for the team during the tournament. Team USA was defeated by Team Japan in the gold medal game.

Statistics

References

External links 
 USA Softball
 

1989 births
Living people
California Golden Bears softball players
Olympic softball players of the United States
Pan American Games medalists in softball
Pan American Games gold medalists for the United States
Pan American Games silver medalists for the United States
Softball players at the 2011 Pan American Games
Softball players at the 2015 Pan American Games
People from Pleasanton, California
Sportspeople from Alameda County, California
Softball players from California
Scrap Yard Dawgs players
Medalists at the 2011 Pan American Games
Softball players at the 2019 Pan American Games
Medalists at the 2019 Pan American Games
Softball players at the 2020 Summer Olympics
Medalists at the 2020 Summer Olympics
Olympic silver medalists for the United States in softball
Olympic medalists in softball